Miguel Muñoz Mora (born 13 April 1995), commonly known as Miki or sometimes Mumo, is a Spanish footballer who plays as a midfielder for Burgos CF.

Club career
Miki was born in Girona, Catalonia, and joined Real Madrid's La Fábrica in 2009, after representing Girona FC and CD Blanes. He made his senior debut with the former's C-team on 23 February 2014, coming on as a late substitute for Mariano Díaz in a 1–0 Segunda División B home win against Bilbao Athletic.

In 2015, after Real Madrid C was dissolved, Miki moved to third division side CE L'Hospitalet. He continued to appear in the category in the following years, representing Lleida Esportiu, Valencia CF Mestalla and Burgos CF; in 2021, he helped the latter in their promotion to Segunda División after a 19-year absence.

Miki made his professional debut on 15 August 2021, replacing Eneko Undabarrena in a 0–1 away draw against Sporting de Gijón.

References

External links

1995 births
Living people
Sportspeople from Girona
Spanish footballers
Footballers from Catalonia
Association football midfielders
Segunda División players
Segunda División B players
Tercera División players
Real Madrid C footballers
CE L'Hospitalet players
Lleida Esportiu footballers
Valencia CF Mestalla footballers
Burgos CF footballers